Eliza & The Delusionals are an Australian indie rock music group, from Gold Coast, Queensland, Australia.

Career
In 2016, Eliza Klatt launched Eliza & the Delusionals. Over the next few years, she worked with producer Konstantin Kersting on a handful of singles, resulting in the band's extended play (EP) The Deeper End, released independently in 2017 which attracted attention on triple j and community radio around the country.

In 2019, the group's overseas profile increased with the release of the single "Just Exist", their first release through Cooking Vinyl Australia. The group released the EP A State of Living in an Objective Reality in March 2020.

In February 2022, Eliza & The Delusionals released "Give You Everything", the lead single from the band's debut album, Now and Then.

Discography

Studio albums

Extended plays

Awards and nominations

J Awards
The J Awards are an annual series of Australian music awards that were established by the Australian Broadcasting Corporation's youth-focused radio station Triple J. They commenced in 2005.

! 
|-
| 2022
| Now and Then
|Australian Album of the Year
| 
|  
|-

Queensland Music Awards
The Queensland Music Awards (previously known as Q Song Awards) are annual awards celebrating Queensland, Australia's brightest emerging artists and established legends. They commenced in 2006.
 
! 
|-
| 2020
| "Just Exist"
| Rock Song of the Year
| 
| 
|-

Rolling Stone Australia Awards
The Rolling Stone Australia Awards are awarded annually in January or February by the Australian edition of Rolling Stone magazine for outstanding contributions to popular culture in the previous year.

! 
|-
| 2023
| Eliza & The Delusionals
| Best New Artist
| 
| 
|-

References

Musical groups established in 2016